Kevin Curran may refer to:

 Kevin Curran (cricketer) (1959–2012), Zimbabwean cricketer
 Kevin Curran (cricketer, born 1928) (1928–2017), Zimbabwean cricketer
 Kevin Curran (footballer, born 1919) (1919–1986), Australian rules footballer for Richmond
 Kevin Curran (footballer, born 1920) (1920–1978), Australian rules footballer for Hawthorn
 Kevin Curran (trade unionist) (born 1954), British trade unionist
 Kevin Curran (writer) (1957–2016), American writer

See also
 Kevin Curren (born 1958), South African former tennis player